Industrial and Labor Relations Review (ILR Review) is a publication of the Cornell University School of Industrial and Labor Relations. It is an interdisciplinary journal publishing original research on all aspects of industrial relations. The editors are Rosemary Batt and Lawrence M. Kahn (Cornell University). The target audience is composed of academics and practitioners in labor and employment relations.

The review covers economics of the workplace, work-life issues, collective bargaining and contract administration, union governance and reform, dispute resolution, history of the labor movement, union organizing, law and other issues.  It publishes approximately 25 book reviews each year. It was founded in 1947. Starting in 2014, SAGE Publications took over publication and increased the frequency from quarterly to five per year.

See also
Cornell HR Review

References

External links
Official site

1947 establishments in New York (state)
Cornell University academic journals
Labour journals
History journals
Economics journals
SAGE Publishing academic journals
English-language journals
Publications established in 1947
5 times per year journals